The first season of the anime television series To Your Eternity was announced by Kodansha on January 8, 2020. The series is animated by Brain's Base and directed by Masahiko Murata, with Shinzō Fujita handling series composition, and Koji Yabuno designing the characters, and Ryo Kawasaki composing the series' music. The plot follows an immortal creature, Fushi, who wanders the Earth after interacting with humans and developing his own will and consciousness in the process.

Originally scheduled to premiere in October 2020, the series was delayed to April 2021 due to the COVID-19 pandemic. The season aired on NHK Educational TV from April 12 to August 30, 2021, and ran for 20 episodes.  Crunchyroll has licensed the anime for streaming outside of Asia. Medialink has also acquired the series to stream under its Ani-One branding.

In Japan, Aniplex released the series in three home media release during 2021 including August 25, 2021, October 27 and December 22.

Hikaru Utada performed the series' opening theme song "PINK BLOOD", while Masashi Hamauzu composes the first season's ending theme song, "Mediator".

Episode list

Home media release
Japanese

Notes

References

To Your Eternity